Shannon Malseed (born 27 December 1994) is an Australian former professional racing cyclist, who rode professionally between 2018 and 2020 for the  team. 

Malseed was victorious at the 2018 Australian National Road Race Championships in Ballarat, beating many race favorites and automatically qualifying a place for the 2018 Commonwealth Games. Malseed won the overall leader jersey for the 2017 Australian National Road Series (NRS), then racing for the highly successful domestic cycling team, Holden Women's Racing.  signed Malseed as a neo-pro for 2018 to race both in the United States and Europe.

At the start of the 2020 season, Malseed broke her scapula during Stage Two of the Bay Crits and missed the rest of the Australian part of the season. She announced her retirement from professional cycling at the end of the 2020 season.

Major results

2015
 National Under-23 Road Championships
1st  Road race
1st  Criterium

2016
 1st  Road race, Oceania Cycling Championships
 2nd Criterium, National Under-23 Road Championships
 5th White Spot / Delta Road Race

2017
 2nd Road race, Oceania Cycling Championships
 National Road Championships
3rd Criterium
4th Road race

2018
 1st  Road race, National Road Championships
 2nd Overall Tour of Chongming Island
 7th Overall Women's Tour Down Under

2019
 2nd Overall Joe Martin Stage Race
1st Stage 2

References

External links

1994 births
Living people
Australian female cyclists
Cyclists at the 2018 Commonwealth Games
Commonwealth Games competitors for Australia
20th-century Australian women
21st-century Australian women